Reto Gilly (born 18 January 1972) is a Swiss former luger. He competed at the 1994 Winter Olympics, the 1998 Winter Olympics and the 2002 Winter Olympics.

References

External links
 

1972 births
Living people
Swiss male lugers
Olympic lugers of Switzerland
Lugers at the 1994 Winter Olympics
Lugers at the 1998 Winter Olympics
Lugers at the 2002 Winter Olympics
Sportspeople from Graubünden